Patrick "Pat" Poels (born  1968) is an American professional poker player from Mesa, Arizona and a two-time World Series of Poker bracelet winner. He currently leads the engineering team at Snyk as the Company's SVP of Engineering, and formerly led engineering for Eventbrite as the Company’s CTO.

Poels won the 2005 World Series of Poker (WSOP) $1500 Limit Omaha Hi-Low Split 8 or Better event earning $270,100, defeating two-time bracelet winner John Lukas in the heads-up play.  Then a year later he won his second bracelet in the $1,000 Seven Card Stud Hi-Low Split 8 or Better event. event.

As of 2009, his total live tournament winnings exceed $900,000.

World Series of Poker bracelets

References

External links
 AZcentral.com – The Arizona Republic article
 LaunchPoker.com – profile

1960s births
American poker players
Living people
World Series of Poker bracelet winners